Herz Kraft Werke is the tenth studio album by German singer Sarah Connor and was released on 31 May 2019 by Polydor Records. Its lead single is "Vincent", which was released along with the album announcement on 5 April. Connor recorded the album in Nashville and London. It follows her 2015 album Muttersprache. It debuted at number one in Austria and Germany.

Background
Connor co-wrote lead single "Vincent" with Peter Plate and Ulf Sommer, and also enlisted cellists Rosie Danvers, Nico Rebscher, Simon Triebel and Ali Zuckowski and producer Djorkaeff for the album.

Track listing
The deluxe edition of the album features 24 tracks; one disc with 15 tracks, and the second with nine.

Charts

Weekly charts

Year-end charts

Certifications

Release history

References

2019 albums
Sarah Connor (singer) albums